Moses, Moishe, Moshe, or Movses (Armenian: Մովսես)  is a male given name, after the biblical figure Moses.

According to the Torah, the name "Moses" comes from the Hebrew verb, meaning "to pull out/draw out" [of water], and the infant Moses was given this name by Pharaoh's daughter after she rescued him from the Nile (Exodus 2:10) Since the rise of Egyptology and decipherment of hieroglyphs, it was postulated that the name of Moses, with a similar pronunciation as the Hebrew Moshe, is the Egyptian word for Son, with Pharaoh names such as Thutmose and Ramesses roughly translating to "son of Thoth" and "son of Ra," respectively.

There are various ways of pronouncing the Hebrew name of Moses, for example in Ashkenazi western European it would be pronounced Mausheh, in Eastern Europe Moysheh, in northern Islamic countries Moussa, and in Yemen Mesha. The nicknames are accordingly (usually with emphasis on the first syllable) Moishe, Moysh, Maish, Moeez, Mo, Moyshee, Musie (pronounced Mooziyeh).

Jews named with the Hebrew name of Moses,  commonly held a similar name in the language of the countries where they were born or lived. In Europe they were named Maurici, Maurice, Morris, Mauricio. In Arabic speaking countries, along with Moussa - the Arabic name for Moses, they were also named Mustafa.

People with this name

Ancient times
 Moses, the most important figure in the Torah
 Moses of Alexandria, alchemist

Medieval
 Moses (bishop of the Arabs) (c. 389), saint, first Arab bishop of the Arab people
 Moses the Black (330–405), saint, ascetic monk and priest in Egypt, a Desert Father
 Moses of Chorene (5th century;), Armenian historian, "father of Armenian history"
 Moses of Kalankatuyk (7th century;), Armenian historian
 Moses the Calm (8th century;), Twelver Shia imam
 Moses the Hungarian (990s–1043;), Russian saint
 Moses ibn Ezra (1070–1138), Jewish, Spanish philosopher
 Moses Kimhi (died c. 1190), medieval rabbi from Hachmei Provence, Occitania (modern France)
 Moses Maimonides (1135–1204), Spanish rabbi, physician, and philosopher
 Moses de León (c. 1250–1305;), Spanish rabbi who is thought to have composed the Zohar
 Moses Shirvani, Jewish writer who authored a Hebrew/Aramaic–Persian dictionary in 1459

Early modern to 18th century
 Moses ben Jacob Cordovero (1522–1570;), a central figure in the historical development of Kabbalah, also known as Ramak
 Moses Holden (1777–1864), English astronomer
 Moses Isserles (1530–1572;), Polish Ashkenazic rabbi and talmudist
 Moses Amyraut (1596–1664; also ), French theologian and metaphysician
 Moyses Hill (died 1629), English army officer who settled in Ireland
 Moses Cordovero (17th century), Italian physician
 Moshe Chaim Luzzatto (1707–1746), Italian rabbi and poet, also known as Ramchal
 Moses Mendelssohn (1729–1786), German Jewish philosopher
 Moses Robinson (1741–1813), judge, governor, and senator from Vermont
 Moses Cleaveland (1754–1806), surveyor of the Connecticut Land Company and founder of Cleveland, Ohio
 Moses Sofer (1762–1839), a leading Orthodox rabbi of European Jewry in the early 19th century
 Moses Montefiore (1784–1885), sheriff of London

Modern
 Moses Alexander (1853–1932), former governor of Idaho
 Moisés Alou (born 1966), American baseball player
 Moshe Arens (1925–2019), Israeli politician
 Moses Barrett III (born 1973), African–American hip hop artist, better known by his stage name Petey Pablo
 Moses Michael Levi Barrow (born Jamal Michael Barrow; 1978), better known by his stage name Shyne, Belizean rapper and politician
 Moshe Bejski (1921–2007), Israeli judge
 Mosè Bianchi (1840–1904), Jewish-Italian painter
 Moysés Blás (born 1937), Brazilian Olympic basketball medallist
 Moses Bloom (1833–1893), American politician, the first Jewish mayor of a major American city (Iowa City, Iowa)
 Moshe Brener (born 1971), Israeli basketball player
 Moses Brown (basketball) (born 1999), American basketball player
 Moses Costa (1950–2020), Bangladeshi Roman Catholic prelate
 Moshe Czerniak (1910–1984), Israeli chess master
 Moshe Dayan (1915–1981), Israeli military leader and politician
 Moses Dyer (born 1997), New Zealand association footballer
 Moses J. Epstein (c. 1911–1960), New York assemblyman
 Moses Jacob Ezekiel (1844–1917), American sculptor
Moshe Gutnick, Australian Orthodox Chabad rabbi 
 Moses Harrison (1932–2013), American jurist
 Moses Hess (1812–1875), French-Jewish Zionist
 Moses Hogan (1957–2003), American composer and arranger of spirituals
 Moe Howard (born Moses Horwitz; 1897–1975), one of the Three Stooges
 Moses Hurvitz (1844–1910), Galician-born Jewish playwright
  (1898–1976), French Ukrainian-born Jewish physicist and radiochemist
 Moses Isegawa (born 1963), Ugandan author
 Moshe Ivgy (born 1953), Israeli actor
 Moshe Kasher (born 1979), American comedian
 Moshe Katsav (born 1945), Israeli-Iranian president of Israel
 Moshe Kaveh (born 1943), Israeli physicist and former President of Bar-Ilan University
 Moses Kotane (1905-1978), South African anti-apartheid activist, Secretary-General of the South African Communist Party from 1939-1978
 Moshe Kotlarsky, Chabad rabbi and spokesman
 Moses Lairy (1859–1927), Justice of the Indiana Supreme Court
 Moses Malone (1955–2015), American basketball player
 Moshe Many, Israeli urologist; President of Tel Aviv University, and President of Ashkelon Academic College
 Moses Martin, the son of Gwyneth Paltrow and Chris Martin
 Moses McKissack Ⅲ (1879–1952), African American architect
 Moses Mbye (born 1993), Australian Rugby League player of Gambian descent
 Moses ka Moyo (1977–2018), South African journalist and activist
 Moshe Mizrahi (basketball) (born 1980), Israeli basketball player
 Moša Pijade (1890–1957), prominent Yugoslav communist and statesman of Sephardic Jewish origin
 Moshe Ponte (born 1956), Israeli Olympic judoka and President of the Israel Judo Association
 Moshe Prywes (1914–1998), Polish-Israeli physician and educator; first President of Ben-Gurion University of the Negev
 Moses Regular (born 1971), American football player
 Moshe Romano (born 1946), Israeli footballer
 Moses Rosen (1912–1994), Romanian rabbi
 Moses Josef Rubin, (1892–1980), Hasidic Jewish cleric in Romania and, later, in New York City
 Moses Russell, (1888–1946) Welsh footballer
 Moshe Safdie (born 1938), Israeli-Canadian architect
 Moshe Sharon (born 1937), Israeli historian of Islam 
 Moses Sherman (1853–1932), American land developer in Arizona and California
 Moses Sithole (born 1964), South African serial killer and rapist
 Moshe Vardi (born 1954), Israeli computer scientist and professor of Computer Science at Rice University
 Moshe Wallach (1866–1957), German-Jewish physician; founder and director of Shaare Zedek Hospital, Jerusalem
 Moshe Weinberg (1939–1972), Israeli Olympic wrestling coach killed in the Munich massacre
 Moshe Weinkrantz (born 1954), Israeli basketball coach
 Moses M. Weinstein (1912–2007), American politician
 Moshe Wilensky (1910–1997), Polish-born Israeli composer
 Moshe Ya'alon (born 1950), Israeli general and politician

Fictional characters
 Moses the raven in Animal Farm
 Moses E. Herzog, title character in Saul Bellow's Herzog

Animals
 Moses (horse), a 19th-century British Thoroughbred

Other uses
 Moishe's, a steakhouse and supermarket food product brand from Montreal, Canada
 Moshe's, a chain of restaurants and cafés in Mumbai, India

Notes

References

Bibliography
Hanks, Patrick and Flavia Hodges, Oxford Dictionary of Names, (1988), Oxford University Press, 

Moses meaning in Eritrea is Mussie OR Musie.

See also
Moises (disambiguation)

Hebrew masculine given names
English masculine given names
Moses meaning in Eritrea is Mussie OR Musie.